Mary Douglas was a British anthropologist.

Mary Douglas may also refer to:

Mary Douglas, 6th Countess of Buchan, wife of James Erskine, 6th Earl of Buchan
Mary Victoria Douglas-Hamilton

See also